Washington County is a county located in the southeastern part of the U.S. state of Ohio. As of the 2020 census, the population was 59,711. Its county seat is Marietta. The county, the oldest in the state, is named for George Washington. Washington County comprises the Marietta, OH Micropolitan Statistical Area, which is also included in the Parkersburg-Marietta-Vienna, WV-OH Combined Statistical Area.

Geography
It is the fifth-largest county in Ohio by land area.

Washington County's southern and eastern boundary is the Ohio River.  The Muskingum River, Little Muskingum River, Duck Creek, and the Little Hocking River flow through the county to the Ohio River.

Adjacent counties
 Noble County (north)
 Monroe County (northeast)
 Tyler County, West Virginia (east)
 Pleasants County, West Virginia (southeast)
 Wood County, West Virginia (south)
 Athens County (southwest)
 Morgan County (northwest)

Major highways

Protected areas
 Wayne National Forest (part)
 Boord State Nature Preserve

Demographics

2000 census
As of the census of 2000, there were 63,251 people, 25,137 households, and 17,671 families living in the county. The population density was 100 people per square mile (38/km2). There were 27,760 housing units at an average density of 44 per square mile (17/km2). The racial makeup of the county was 97.33% White, 0.92% Black or African American, 0.24% Native American, 0.43% Asian, 0.05% Pacific Islander, 0.13% from other races, and 0.89% from two or more races. 0.51% of the population were Hispanic or Latino of any race. 29.5% were of German, 23.4% American, 12.3% English and 11.0% Irish ancestry according to Census 2000.

There were 25,137 households, out of which 30.90% had children under the age of 18 living with them, 57.90% were married couples living together, 9.10% had a female householder with no husband present, and 29.70% were non-families. 25.40% of all households were made up of individuals, and 11.20% had someone living alone who was 65 years of age or older. The average household size was 2.45 and the average family size was 2.93.

In the county, the population was spread out, with 23.50% under the age of 18, 8.80% from 18 to 24, 27.50% from 25 to 44, 25.10% from 45 to 64, and 15.00% who were 65 years of age or older. The median age was 39 years. For every 100 females there were 94.60 males. For every 100 females age 18 and over, there were 91.00 males.

The median income for a household in the county was $34,275, and the median income for a family was $41,605. Males had a median income of $32,034 versus $21,346 for females. The per capita income for the county was $18,082. About 8.60% of families and 11.40% of the population were below the poverty line, including 15.70% of those under age 18 and 10.20% of those age 65 or over.

2010 census
As of the 2010 United States Census, there were 61,778 people, 25,587 households, and 17,092 families living in the county. The racial makeup of the county was 96.5% white, 1.1% black or African American, 0.6% Asian, 0.2% American Indian, 0.2% from other races, and 1.5% from two or more races. Those of Hispanic or Latino origin made up 0.7% of the population. In terms of ancestry, 29.3% were German, 16.7% were Irish, 11.8% were English, and 10.7% were American.

Of the 25,587 households, 28.4% had children under the age of 18 living with them, 52.5% were married couples living together, 10.0% had a female householder with no husband present, 33.2% were non-families, and 28.1% of all households were made up of individuals. The average household size was 2.34 and the average family size was 2.84. The median age was 43.0 years.

The median income for a household in the county was $41,654 and the median income for a family was $53,131. Males had a median income of $42,460 versus $28,828 for females. The per capita income for the county was $22,786. About 10.8% of families and 15.2% of the population were below the poverty line, including 22.5% of those under age 18 and 10.0% of those age 65 or over.

Government
Washington County has a 3-member Board of County Commissioners that oversee the various County departments, similar to all but 2 of the 88 Ohio counties. Washington County's elected commissioners are: Kevin Ritter (R), James Booth (R), and Charlie Schilling (R).

Politics

Washington County typically votes Republican. In 1976, it was one of only two counties on the eastern Ohio border to vote for President Gerald Ford, and in 1996, it was the only county on the eastern border to vote for Bob Dole. Only five Democratic Party presidential candidates have won the county from 1856 to the present day, the most recent being Lyndon B. Johnson in his statewide & national landslide of 1964.

|}

Education
There are six high schools that serve the people of Washington County (as of 2016).
 Belpre Golden Eagles
 Beverly Fort Frye Cadets
 New Matamoras Frontier Cougars
 Marietta Tigers
 Vincent Warren Warriors
 Waterford Wildcats

There is also the Washington County Career Center, a tech school, Washington State Community College, a two-year college, and Marietta College, a four-year college. All are located in Marietta.

Communities

Cities
 Belpre
 Marietta (county seat)

Villages
 Beverly
 Lower Salem
 Lowell
 Macksburg
 Matamoras

Townships

Source
 Adams
 Aurelius
 Barlow
 Belpre
 Decatur
 Dunham
 Fairfield
 Fearing
 Grandview
 Independence
 Lawrence
 Liberty
 Ludlow
 Marietta
 Muskingum
 Newport
 Palmer
 Salem
 Warren
 Waterford
 Watertown
 Wesley

Census-designated places
 Devola
 Little Hocking
 Newport
 Reno
 Vincent
 Waterford

Unincorporated communities

 Archers Fork
 Barlow
 Bartlett
 Beavertown
 Beckett
 Bevan
 Bloomfield
 Bonn
 Briggs
 Caywood
 Churchtown
 Coal Run
 Constitution
 Cornerville
 Cow Run
 Cutler
 Dalzell
 Dart
 Decaturville
 Deucher
 Dunbar
 Dunham
 Elba
 Equity
 Fillmore
 Fleming
 Germantown
 Gracey
 Grandview
 Layman
 Leith
 Lower Newport
 Luke Chute
 Moore Junction
 Moss Run
 Newell Run
 Oak Grove
 Patten Mills
 Pinehurst
 Qualey
 Rainbow
 Relief
 Sitka
 Stanleyville
 Tick Ridge
 Veto
 Wade
 Warner
 Watertown
 Whipple
 Wingett Run
 Yankeeburg

See also
 Covered bridges of southeast Ohio
 National Register of Historic Places listings in Washington County, Ohio

References

Further reading
 Israel Ward Andrews, Washington County, and the Early Settlement of Ohio: Being the Centennial Historical Address, before the Citizens of Washington County. Cincinnati, OH: P.G. Thomson, 1877.
 Martin Register Andrews and Seymour J. Hathaway, History of Marietta and Washington County, Ohio, and Representative Citizens. Chicago : Biographical Publishing Co., 1902.
 William Dana Emerson, et al., Washington County, Ohio. Marietta, OH: Washington County Historical Society, 1976.
 Henry Howe, History of Washington County, Ohio, 1788-1889. Knightstown, IN: Bookmark, 1977.
 Thomas William Lewis, History of Southeastern Ohio and the Muskingum Valley, 1788-1928. In Three Volumes. Chicago: S.J. Clarke Publishing Co., 1928.
 Washington County Historical Society, Washington County, Ohio, to 1980: A Collection of Topical and Family Sketches. Marietta, OH: Washington County Historical Society, 1980.
 H.Z. Williams & Bro., History of Washington County, Ohio: With Illustrations and Biographical Sketches. Cleveland, OH: H.Z. Williams, 1881.

External links
 County website
 The Marietta Times newspaper website

 
Appalachian Ohio
Counties of Appalachia
Ohio counties on the Ohio River